The booklet Mourt's Relation (full title: A Relation or Journal of the Beginning and Proceedings of the English Plantation Settled at Plimoth in New England) was written between November 1620 and November 1621, and describes in detail what happened from the landing of the Mayflower Pilgrims on Cape Cod in Provincetown Harbor through their exploring and eventual settling of Plymouth Colony. It was written primarily by Edward Winslow, although William Bradford appears to have written most of the first section.  The book describes their relations with the surrounding Native Americans, up to what is commonly called the first Thanksgiving and the arrival of the ship Fortune in November 1621.  Mourt's Relation was first published and sold by John Bellamy in London in 1622. This significant tract has often been erroneously cited as "by George Morton, sometimes called George Mourt" (hence the title Mourt's Relation).

Morton was an Puritan Separatist who had moved to Leiden, Holland. He stayed behind when the first settlers left for Plymouth, Massachusetts, but he continued to orchestrate business affairs in Europe and London for their cause—presumably arranging for the publication of and perhaps helping write Mourt's Relation. In 1623, Morton himself emigrated to the Plymouth Colony with his wife Juliana, the sister of Governor William Bradford's wife Alice. But George Morton didn't survive long in the New World; he died the following year in 1624.

George Morton's son Nathaniel Morton became the clerk of Plymouth Colony, a close adviser to his uncle Governor William Bradford who raised him after the death of his father, and the author of the influential early history of the Plymouth Colony "New England's Memorial."

A sixty-year long tradition at The Wall Street Journal is to reprint the section on the "first Thanksgiving" on the Wednesday before the holiday.

The booklet was summarized by other publications without the now-familiar Thanksgiving story, but the original booklet appeared to be lost or forgotten by the eighteenth century.  A copy was rediscovered in Philadelphia in 1820, with the first full reprinting in 1841. In a footnote, editor Alexander Young was the first person to identify the 1621 feast as "the first Thanksgiving."

In 1921, a copy sold at auction for $3,800.

Notes

References

  Reprint of the original version.

External links
Mourt's Relation as transcribed by Caleb Johnson
Mourt's Relation as transcribed by Caleb Johnson
A Journal of the Pilgrims at Plymouth; Mourt's Relation as edited by Dwight B. Heath, at Project Gutenberg
Mourt's relation or journal of the plantation at Plymouth Full-text copies from HathiTrust

1622 books
History of the Thirteen Colonies
Plymouth Colony
Thanksgiving